Miles Evergood (10 January 1871 – 3 January 1939) was an Australian artist who achieved renown in Europe and the United States, as well as his native country. He was the father of American artist Philip Evergood.

Biography 
Evergood was born Myer Blashki in Melbourne, eleventh child of Phillip Blashki, manufacturer of masonic regalia and jeweller, and his wife Hannah, née Immergut.

Evergood was educated at the Melbourne Hebrew Day School and Angel College, later crediting his ability to write and to argue to influential teachers there, especially Rev. Jacob Goldstein. Goldstein in 1908 wrote a front-page article about Evergood in the New York Hebrew Standard. He studied at the National Gallery School of Art under Frederick McCubbin and Bernard Hall between 1893 and 1895. His friends and colleagues were the group who exhibited the first recognisable style of Australian painting. They included Max Meldrum, George Coates, and James Quinn, who formed themselves into bohemian clubs to discuss contemporary concerns like socialism and the rights of the individual.

Evergood exhibited at the Victorian Artists Society, and the Royal Art Society of New South Wales, Sydney, before leaving for the United States in 1898 together with fellow-artist Frank (Francis) McComas. He worked for the Hearst newspapers in San Francisco before moving on to New York City, where he exhibited and was subsequently invited to be a member of both the Salamgundi and Lotos Clubs. He went to London, where he married Flora Jane Perry, whom he had probably met in Sydney.  The family moved to New York, where art critics Henri Pene du Bois and James Huneker wrote glowingly of his works. as did Hanna Astrup Larsen in the glossy journal International Studio. Miles and Flora had one child, named Philip Howard Francis Dixon Blashki (1901-1973). In 1910 Miles exhibited five paintings in the first exhibition of the Society of Independent Artists held in New York.

For about twenty years he regularly visited Europe, establishing a good reputation as a painter. After returning with the family to live in England in 1910. in 1914 he his landscape was hung the Paris Salon. For eight years he exhibited with the International Society, at Burlington House, with the Society of Painters and 'Gravers and the New English Arts Club. He changed his name to Miles Evergood about 1914 in London, to enable his son Philip to get a commission in the British Navy. Then-Lord of the Admiralty, Winston Churchill wrote a handwritten reply to his query, suggesting that "Blashki" was not a suitable name for an officer in an Anglo Saxon navy.

Evergood returned to Australia in July 1931 and worked for eighteen months in Queensland and became a member of the Royal Queensland Art Society. He then went to Sydney and then Melbourne holding exhibitions of his work, and died of cancer in Melbourne on 3 January 1939. Evergood was a capable artist, who mostly painted landscapes in oil with affinities to the post impressionists. He left a de facto partner, Pauline Konitzer Romero, and his son, Philip Evergood, who became an artist living in America, substantially eclipsing the career of his father Miles.

References

Bibliography

External links
Miles Evergood at the National Gallery of Victoria

1871 births
1939 deaths
Australian Jews
Australian people of Polish-Jewish descent
Deaths from cancer in Victoria (Australia)
Artists from Melbourne
20th-century Australian painters
20th-century Australian male artists
Australian male painters
National Gallery of Victoria Art School alumni
Australian expatriates in the United States